Golden Gala is an annual track and field event normally held at the Olympic Stadium in Rome, Italy. Previously one of the IAAF Golden League events, it is now part of the Diamond League.  Following the 2013 death of Italian sprinting legend Pietro Mennea, the organizers added his name to the title of the meet.

The 2021 event was temporarily relocated to Florence.

History
Primo Nebiolo, the Italian president of IAAF since 1981, was the founder of the Golden Gala and had the idea to bring the athletes and the people from the United States and the NATO countries together that were boycotting the Moscow Olympics in 1980 as a result of the Soviet invasion of Afghanistan. Nebiolo died of a heart attack at age 76 in 1999.

At the 2009 edition of the Golden Gala, Kenenisa Bekele, Kerron Stewart, Sanya Richards and Yelena Isinbayeva all remained on target for the 2009 Golden League jackpot. In the 100 m, Tyson Gay equalled his American record and Daniel Bailey set an Antiguan record in the men's race. Antonietta Di Martino brought the sole Italian victory in Rome by beating off favourite Blanka Vlašić in the high jump.

World records
Over the course of its history, eight world records have been set at the Gala.  The 1500 metres and Mile records by Hicham El Guerrouj still stand.  In 2014 Joanne Pavey's 15:04.87 in the 5000 metres bettered the existing masters world record in the W40 division by almost 16 seconds.

Meet records

Men

Women

See also
Notturna di Milano
Rieti meeting

References

External links
Diamond League – Rome Official Web Site
Golden Gala Meeting Records

Diamond League
Sports competitions in Rome
IAAF Golden League
G
Athletics competitions in Italy
Summer events in Italy
Athletics in Rome
IAAF World Outdoor Meetings
Golden Gala